Slugs is a 2004 Austrian comedy film directed by Michael Glawogger.

Cast 
 Raimund Wallisch - Johann
 Michael Ostrowski - Max
 Pia Hierzegger - Mao
 Iva Lukic - Mara
 Sophia Laggner - Martha
 Georg Friedrich - Schorsch
  - Reini
 Brigitte Kren - Anita
 Elisabeth Holzmeister - Julia
  - Gerhard
 Faris Rahoma - Zejlko
 August Schmölzer - Zuhälter
  - Grissemann

References

External links 

2004 comedy-drama films
2004 films
Austrian comedy-drama films